Allan R. Graco (born 29 January 1948) is a former Australian rules footballer who played for the Essendon Football Club in the Victorian Football League (VFL). He later played for North Melbourne's reserves and then Doutta Stars, the club he had been originally recruited to Essendon from.

Notes

External links 
		

Essendon Football Club past player profile

Living people
1948 births
Australian rules footballers from Victoria (Australia)
Essendon Football Club players
Doutta Stars Football Club players